Pomeroy Plunketts is a Gaelic Athletic Association club based in the village of Pomeroy in County Tyrone, Northern Ireland.

Achievements
 Tyrone Intermediate Football Championship 
 1967, 1991, 2004, 2016 
 Ulster Intermediate Club Football Championship (2) 
 2004, 2016
 Tyrone Junior Football Championship (3)
 1935, 1945, 1984

References

External links
 Pomeroy Plunketts GAA

Gaelic games clubs in County Tyrone
Gaelic football clubs in County Tyrone